Kuchu may refer to:
 Kuchu, Iran
Kuchu, son and heir of Ögedei Khan
Kuchu, a word for "homosexual" used in Uganda, see Call Me Kuchu